is a Japanese term in the game of Go that refers to capturing a single stone, resulting in a diamond shape. The shape of the remaining capturing stones is considered to be very strong, due to its influence in all directions. A certain Go proverb says: "A Ponnuki is worth 30 points".

A diamond shape (4 stones touching the same empty spot) is considered a ponnuki only when constructed by capturing the middle stone.

Depending on the context (other stones on the board), a ponnuki may be strong and thick but inefficient (overconcentrated).

Etymology 
The word ponnuki (ポン抜き) breaks up into pon and nuki, in which pon is the sound of a cork when taken from a bottle, while nuki means "taking out" (noun), the expression means, 'to pop the cork', a poetic reference to taking the stone out of the centre.

References
 Ponnuki on Sensei's Library

Go shapes